Paul Brewster (born 20 August 1971) is a former Gaelic footballer who played for the Fermanagh county team for a number of years. He played his club football with Enniskillen Gaels, with whom he won Fermanagh Senior Football Championships in 1992, 1998, 1999, 2000, 2001, 2002, 2003 & 2006, he also won three Fermanagh Minor Football Championships. He also played for Queen's University Belfast, winning a Sigerson Cup as captain in 1993. He also played for Ireland in the 1998 International Rules Series. As of 2015, he was "helping out behind the scenes" with his local Bellaghy club.

References

1971 births
Living people
Alumni of Queen's University Belfast
Enniskillen Gaels Gaelic footballers
Fermanagh inter-county Gaelic footballers
Irish international rules football players